Sutherland High School is a public English medium co-educational high school situated in the suburb of Eldoraigne, Centurion in the Gauteng province of South Africa, It is one of the top and academic schools in the Gauteng province, The school was established in 1987.

School houses 
Upon successful registration at Sutherland High School, students are divided among the following eight houses:

These houses compete in various sporting and cultural competitions throughout the year.

Leadership programmes 
The School of Leadership is a youth leadership development initiative that is unique to Sutherland High School.

Red blazer programme 
Learners at Sutherland High School can sign up for the "Red Blazer" programme. This is the most prestigious award that the School of Leadership offers. The main characteristics of a red blazer recipient are respect, integrity and accountability. Below is a more extensive description of each requirement of the Red Blazer programmes.

Desert walk 
Desert walk is the first event that the School of Leadership offered. Learners are expected to endure a walk through the desert through challenging physical activities and limited food and sleep.

Mentor programme
The mentor programme was initiated in 2009 where Grade 8 pupils were allocated a Grade 11 pupil who would look after them, “showing them the ropes” of Sutherland High School, and helping them cope with their first year of high school.

Sports activities 
Sutherland High School is part of the Pretoria English Medium High School Athletics Association (PEMHSAA), and has won the association's inter-highschool events 20 consecutive times from 1991 to 2011.

Sutherland High School has been performing very well on sports during the year.

The sports that are offered in the school are:

 Archery
 Athletics
 Chess
 Cricket
 Cross country
 Equestrian
 Golf
 Hockey
 Netball (Girls) 
 Rugby (Boys) 
 Shooting
 Football (soccer)
 Swimming
 Table tennis
 Tennis
 Water polo

Notable alumni 
Gareth Cliff
 Nicole Flint, Miss South Africa 2009
Llewellyn Devereaux
Taiylor Manson

Accolades 
In September 2011, the school set a world record for the most solved Rubik's Cubes in one hour: 711, exceeding the previous record of 300 in an hour. Five years later in 2016, this record was surpassed by nine students in India–2,454 in one hour.

References 

High schools in South Africa
Educational institutions established in 1987
1987 establishments in South Africa